Giannis Michalopoulos (22 April 1927 – 10 June 2016) was a Greek actor.

Biography
Michalopoulos was born in Athens.  He mostly acted in supporting roles, appearing in many movies, his most famous being Ah afti i yineka mou (Oh! That Wife of Mine), and  Anthropos yia oles tis doulies.  He also had many roles on television; his most famous being Orkisteite parakalo, in which he acted as a judge in a court. He died in Athens.

Filmography

References

External links

1927 births
2016 deaths
Male actors from Athens